Neritus or Neritos may refer to:

Neritus (Acarnania), a town of ancient Acarnania
Nirito, a mountain near Kioni Bay
Trichromia, a genus of moths, syn. Neritos